The Price of Fame is a 2014 French comedy-drama film written and directed by Xavier Beauvois with an original score by composer Michel Legrand. The film was inspired by the true story about two marginalized immigrants who dug up Charlie Chaplin's coffin for ransom money in the 1970s. Its world premiere was 28 August 2014, directly competing for the Golden Lion at the 71st Venice International Film Festival. It was released on 7 January 2015 in France.

Plot
The story, inspired by actual events, takes place in 1977 in the Swiss town of Vevey, on Lake Geneva. Eddy, a 40-year-old thug, has just been released from the prison. In order to stay in his friend Osman's trailer, Eddy will have to take care of Osman's 7-year-old daughter Samira as Osman's wife Noor is hospitalized. It is the Christmas season, but the trio finds it hard to make ends meet and so, a crazy idea strikes Eddy when a news flash announces the death of Charlie Chaplin: they will steal the famous actor's coffin and demand a ransom from the family.

Cast

 Benoît Poelvoorde as Eddy Ricaart
 Roschdy Zem as Osman Bricha
 Séli Gmach as Samira Bricha
 Chiara Mastroianni as Rosa
 Nadine Labaki as Noor Bricha
 Peter Coyote as John Crooker 
 Xavier Maly as Inspector Maltaverne 
 Arthur Beauvois as The young Inspector
 Dolores Chaplin as Mademoiselle Chaplin
 Xavier Beauvois as Monsieur Loyal
 Philippe Laudenbach as The prosecutor 
 Adel Bencherif as Osman's Friend
 Olivier Rabourdin as The medecin
 Eugène Chaplin as Circus director 
 Macha Méril as Oona Chaplin (voice) 
 Marilyne Canto as The secretary
 Louis-Do de Lencquesaing as The lawyer
 Isabelle Caillat as The nurse

References

External links
 
 

2014 films
2014 comedy-drama films
2010s French-language films
French comedy-drama films
Films scored by Michel Legrand
Films directed by Xavier Beauvois
French films based on actual events
Films set in Switzerland
Cultural depictions of Charlie Chaplin
Tragicomedy films
2010s French films